Marcia MacMillan  is a Canadian news anchor for CTV News Channel broadcasting the weekday evening news. She started working for CTV News in November 2005. MacMillan started her broadcasting career as a reporter for MCTV in Sudbury, Ontario then for MCTV in North Bay, Ontario. She then moved on to CKWS in Kingston, Ontario. She also reported for The Weather Network, CHCH-TV and Toronto 1. She earned both a bachelor's degree in political science from the University of Western Ontario and a graduate degree in journalism from Ryerson University's Graduate School of Journalism and graduated from Ancaster High School in 1989. She is from the Ancaster community of Hamilton, Ontario.

She had a health scare in 2012 when she was diagnosed with "a lot of blood clots in both lungs".

She is also one of the fill-in anchors for CTV National News.

References

External links 
 CTV News Channel biography of Marcia MacMillan

Canadian television news anchors
People from Hamilton, Ontario
Journalists from Ontario
Toronto Metropolitan University alumni
University of Western Ontario alumni
Living people
1970 births
Canadian women television journalists
21st-century Canadian journalists